Flaunt the Imperfection is the third studio album by English new wave group China Crisis, released in 1985.

The album was produced by Steely Dan co-founder Walter Becker, who is credited as an official member of China Crisis on the record sleeve. Becker apparently requested to meet with the band after hearing their song "Papua" from their 1983 album Working with Fire and Steel. He was subsequently signed on as producer to begin work on the album with the assistance of Phill Brown, sound engineer with the Rolling Stones and Jimi Hendrix.

The album is the most successful by the band, peaking at No. 9 on the UK Albums Chart and staying for 22 weeks. The singles "Black Man Ray" and "King in a Catholic Style" both reached the Top 20 in the UK Singles Chart.

Critical reception
In his review, Stewart Mason of AllMusic notes that "the group's songwriting is much improved, [with] the failed instrumental experiments and tiresome dance workouts that occasionally marred their earlier albums replaced with a newfound melodic sophistication and lyrical acuity."

Track listing
All tracks written by Garry Daly, Gary Johnson and Eddie Lundon.
"The Highest High" – 4:16
"Strength of Character" – 2:50
"You Did Cut Me" – 4:18
"Black Man Ray" – 3:39
"Wall of God" – 5:32
"Gift of Freedom" – 4:38
"King in a Catholic Style" – 4:32
"Bigger the Punch I'm Feeling" – 4:21
"The World Spins, I'm Part of It" – 4:12
"Blue Sea" – 4:46

Personnel
Garry Daly – vocals, synthesizer
Eddie Lundon – guitar, vocals
Walter Becker – synthesizer, percussion
Gary "Gazza" Johnson – bass, programming
Kevin Wilkinson – drums, percussion

Additional personnel
Tim Renwick - all guitar solos
Steve Gregory - saxophone
Nick Magnus - grand piano, synthesizer, programming
Tim Sanders - tenor and soprano saxophone
Simon Clarke - alto and baritone saxophone, flute
Roddy Lorimer - trumpet, flugelhorn
Pete Thoms - trombone
Colin Campsie - backing vocals
Ginny Clee - backing vocals

Charts

Weekly charts

Year-end charts

Certifications and sales

References

1985 albums
China Crisis albums
Virgin Records albums
Albums produced by Walter Becker